Sérgio Leandro Seixas Santos (born 23 March 1979) known as Sérgio Batata or just Batata is a Brazilian-born Polish footballer who plays as a defender or midfielder for Luciążanka Przygłów.

Career
In his youth Batata played for Clube Atlético Mineiro and Cruzeiro, before being brought to Poland by Antoni Ptak in 1997. He made his debut in Poland for ŁKS Łódź on 11 May 1997 against Polonia Warsaw. His career was mostly decided by Ptak, moving to clubs when it had been decided for him, which resulted in Batata playing for a total of 15 different Polish clubs. 

In 2003, Polish national team manager, Paweł Janas, was impressed with Batata that he wanted him to play for the Poland national team, meaning Batata had to apply for Polish citizenship. Accepting Polish citizenship would mean he'd have to rescind his Brazilian citizenship, and was given his citizenship in 2006. By this point Janas was no longer manager and Batata had suffered a few major injuries impacting his playing time. His two major career successes were winning the Copa do Brasil in 1996 with Cruzeiro and the Ekstraklasa Cup in 2007–08 with Dyskobolia Grodzisk Wielkopolski.

Batata made over 300 appearances in Poland, playing for clubs such as ŁKS Łódź (three times), Piotrcovia Piotrków Trybunalski (three times), Polonia Gdańsk, Lechia-Polonia Gdańsk, GKS Katowice, Pogon Szczecin, KSZO Ostrowiec Świętokrzyski, Widzew Łódź, Dyskobolia Grodzisk Wielkopolski,  Warta Poznań, Stal Niewiadów, Zawisza Bydgoszcz, Kotwica Kołobrzeg, Motor Lublin, and Chełmianka Chełm.

Honours

Cruzeiro
Copa do Brasil: 1996

Dyskobolia Grodzisk Wielkopolski
Ekstraklasa Cup: 2007–08

References

External links
 

1979 births
Clube Atlético Mineiro players
Cruzeiro Esporte Clube players
ŁKS Łódź players
Polonia Gdańsk players
Lechia Gdańsk players
GKS Katowice players
Pogoń Szczecin players
KSZO Ostrowiec Świętokrzyski players
TuS Koblenz players
Dyskobolia Grodzisk Wielkopolski players
Warta Poznań players
Zawisza Bydgoszcz players
Kotwica Kołobrzeg footballers
Motor Lublin players
Chełmianka Chełm players
Ekstraklasa players
I liga players
II liga players
III liga players
Brazilian footballers
Polish footballers
Association football midfielders
Association football defenders
Living people
Naturalized citizens of Poland